is a temple of the Tendai sect in Kobe, Hyōgo Prefecture, Japan.

It was created as a tatchu temple (branch) in Taisan-ji.

An'yō-in's karesansui completed in Azuchi–Momoyama period is a national Place of Scenic Beauty.

Building list 
Shoin: It was built in the 1730s.
Sanmon
Karesansui

See also 
Japanese garden

Gallery

External links 

三身山「太山寺」 (Japanese)

Gardens in Japan
Parks and gardens in Kobe
Tendai
Places of Scenic Beauty
Buildings and structures in Kobe
Buddhist temples in Hyōgo Prefecture
Tourist attractions in Kobe